The Diocese of Ihosy is a Roman Catholic Diocese under the Archdiocese of Fianarantsoa in Madagascar. It is based in the town of Ihosy and was erected on 13 April 1967. It performs the Latin Rite. The Diocese covers approximately 40,990 km (15,832 sq. miles). As of 2004, the diocese population was about 310,000, with 18.1% Catholic. 36 priests were in the Diocese for a ratio of 1,560 Catholics for every 1 Priest. Fulgence Razakarivony, M.S. has been the bishop of the Diocese since July 2011.

Ordinaries
Luigi Dusio, C.M. (13 Apr 1967 - 2 Nov 1970)
Jean-Guy Rakodondravahatra, M.S. (25 Mar 1972 - 21 Sep 1996)
Philippe Ranaivomanana (2 Jan 1999 - 13 Nov 2009), appointed Bishop of Antsirabé
Fulgence Razakarivony, M.S. (16 Jul 2011 - )

References

External links
 Profile of Ihosy Diocese

Roman Catholic dioceses in Madagascar
1967 establishments in Madagascar
Roman Catholic Ecclesiastical Province of Fianarantsoa